Chunta Q'atawi (Aymara chunta prolonged, lengthened, q'atawi lime, "prolonged lime (mountain)", Hispanicized spelling Chuntajatahui) is a  mountain in the Andes of Peru. It is situated in the Puno Region, Carabaya Province, Crucero District.

References 

Mountains of Puno Region
Mountains of Peru